Paraburkholderia unamae is a species of bacteria.

References

unamae
Bacteria described in 2004